Gilbert Coleman was a professional baseball right fielder in the Negro leagues. He played with the Bacharach Giants in 1929 and the Newark Browns in 1932.

References

External links
 and Seamheads

Bacharach Giants players
Newark Browns players
Year of birth missing
Year of death missing
Baseball outfielders